The IndyCar Series on ABC, also known as the IndyCar Series on ESPN,  was the branding used for coverage of the IndyCar Series produced by ESPN, and formerly broadcast on ABC television network in the United States (through its ESPN on ABC division).

Overview
ABC first began airing races that are now part of the IndyCar Series in 1965 with that year's running of the Indianapolis 500 on its Wide World of Sports anthology series, with the network having broadcast the 500 every year until 2019.

By the late 1980s, ABC carried many of the CART PPG IndyCar World Series races that supported the Indy 500. In late 1987, Paul Page was recruited from NBC Sports to join Bobby Unser (who worked with Paul at NBC) and Sam Posey in the broadcast booth to form what remains as one of the most memorable trios in American auto racing broadcasting. Page provided enthusiasm (and popular Indy 500 intros with the theme music from Delta Force), Unser his unmistakable directness, and Posey his signature artistic and poetic perspective of the sport. In 1989 and 1990, their presentation of the Indy 500 earned the network the Sports Emmy for the year's Outstanding Live Sports Special. By then, their pit reporters were Jack Arute, Gary Gerould, and Dr. Jerry Punch. All 6 men were often on ABC's broadcasts of the International Race of Champions and of NASCAR Winston Cup.

In 1996, Indianapolis Motor Speedway President Tony George led a group of breakaway owners in the founding of the Indy Racing League, with the 500 being its premier event. ABC added coverage of IRL races to the 500, and continued to broadcast CART Championship races through 2001. From the league's inception in 1996 through 2008, ESPN and ESPN2 also each carried several of the IndyCar Series, before losing the cable television rights to the series to Versus (now NBCSN). ABC and ESPN were IndyCar's exclusive television partners from 2000 to 2008. Despite losing the cable rights, on August 10, 2011, ESPN renewed ABC's end of its broadcast deal with the league through 2018.

Under that contract the network typically aired five races annually, though it had occasionally aired six during the season. In 2014, ABC celebrated its 50th consecutive broadcast of the Indianapolis 500.

ABC's coverage of the 2013 Firestone 550 at Texas Motor Speedway was the first prime time broadcast for the network. At the 2017 Indianapolis 500, ABC introduced "Race Strategist" (which featured predictive analysis of race conditions) and first-person "visor cam" views from Graham Rahal and Josef Newgarden.

Criticism
IndyCar fans who have criticized ESPN on ABC's race broadcasts have used "Always Bad Coverage" as a derisive backronym pertaining to the quality of the telecasts.

Loss of IndyCar coverage
On March 21, 2018, NBC Sports announced that it had acquired the television rights to the IndyCar Series (after previously serving as cable rightsholder through NBCSN or CNBC for races not aired by ABC), replacing the package of races on ABC with a package of eight races on NBC, including the Indianapolis 500 (ending ABC's 54-year tenure as broadcaster of the event).

ABC’s final IndyCar telecast was the second race of the Detroit Grand Prix on June 3, 2018.

On-air staff

2018 team
Allen Bestwick was the lap-by-lap commentator while former IndyCar drivers Scott Goodyear and Eddie Cheever served as color commentators. Former driver Jon Beekhuis and Rick DeBruhl reported from the pits.

Former hosts
This includes ABC's coverage of USAC, CART and Champ Car, as well as IRL and INDYCAR-sanctioned races, from 1965 through 2018:
Nicole Briscoe
Charlie Brockman
Lindsay Czarniak
Dave Diles
Terry Gannon
Keith Jackson
Bob Jenkins
Jim McKay
Al Michaels
Brent Musburger
Paul Page
Chris Schenkel
Jackie Stewart

Former play-by-play
Rick Benjamin
Allen Bestwick
Charlie Brockman
Todd Harris
Keith Jackson
Bob Jenkins
Jim Lampley
Jim McKay
Paul Page
Marty Reid
Chris Schenkel
Jackie Stewart
Al Trautwig
Bob Varsha

Former analysts
Jack Arute
Jon Beekhuis
Eddie Cheever, 1998 Indianapolis 500 winner
Gil de Ferran, 2003 Indianapolis 500 winner
Chris Economaki
Scott Goodyear
Parker Johnstone
Arie Luyendyk, 2 time Indy 500 winner
Sam Posey
Jason Priestley
Larry Rice
Tom Sneva, 1983 Indianapolis 500 winner
Lyn St. James
Jackie Stewart
Danny Sullivan, 1985 Indianapolis 500 winner
Bobby Unser, 3 time Indy 500 winner
Rusty Wallace
Rodger Ward, 2 time Indy 500 winner

Former pit reporters
Jack Arute
Jon Beekhuis
Michelle Beisner
Charlie Brockman
Donna de Varona
Rick DeBruhl
Dave Diles
Chris Economaki
Bill Flemming
Ray Gandolf
Jerry Gappens
Gary Gerould
Leslie Gudel
Brian Hammons
Todd Harris
Don Hein
Penn Holderness
Keith Jackson
Jim Lampley
David Letterman
Jamie Little
Jim McKay
Larry Nuber
Brienne Pedigo
Jerry Punch
Sam Posey
Scott Pruett
Marty Reid
Lyn St. James
Chris Schenkel
Anne Simon
Cameron Steele
Bill Stephens
Al Trautwig
Vince Welch
Jack Whitaker

References

1970s American television series
1980s American television series
1990s American television series
2000s American television series
2018 American television series endings
1965 American television series debuts
Sports telecast series
ABC
American Broadcasting Company original programming
ABC Sports
Wide World of Sports (American TV series)